Rubrobacteria is a class of Actinomycetota.

Phylogeny

Taxonomy
The currently accepted taxonomy is based on the List of Prokaryotic names with Standing in Nomenclature (LPSN) and National Center for Biotechnology Information (NCBI).

 Order Rubrobacterales Suzuki et al. 1989
 Family Rubrobacteraceae Rainey et al. 1997
 Genus Rubrobacter Rainey et al. 1997
 R. aplysinae Kämpfer et al. 2014
 R. bracarensis Jurado et al. 2013
 R. calidifluminis Albuquerque et al. 2014
 R. indicoceani Chen et al. 2018
 R. marinus Chen et al. 2020
 R. naiadicus Albuquerque et al. 2014
 R. radiotolerans (Yoshinaka, Yano & Yamaguchi 1973) Suzuki et al. 1989
 R. spartanus Norman et al. 2017
 R. taiwanensis Chen et al. 2004
 R. tropicus Chen et al. 2020
 "R. wessexii" 
 R. xylanophilus Carreto et al. 1996

See also
 List of bacteria genera
 List of bacterial orders

References

Actinomycetota
Bacteria classes